The Australian Bar Association (ABA) is the peak body representing more than 6,000 barristers throughout Australia.  

The ABA was established in 1963 to serve, promote and represent its members, and advocate for fair and equal justice for all. The ABA’s members are barristers registered to practise law in Australia and who are also members of a State or Territory Bar Association.

The ABA's vision is to be the national voice for the independent Bars of Australia. Its purpose is to promote the administration of justice, the rule of law and the excellence of the Bar. The ABA supports its members and the community by delivering services to promote the rule of law and access to justice; fostering a collegiate, inclusive and diverse national association of barristers; maintaining and enhancing professional standards; and providing opportunities for members to enhance professional performance.

The current President of the ABA is Peter Dunning KC (Queensland). Roisin Annesley KC (VIC) and Dominic Toomey SC (NSW) are Vice-Presidents, Andrew Muller (ACT) is Treasurer and Ian Robertson SC (SA) is chair of the Advocacy Training Council.

Constituent Bar Associations   
The ABA's constituent Bar Associations are:
 Australian Capital Territory Bar Association
 Bar Association of Queensland
 New South Wales Bar Association
 Northern Territory Bar Association
 South Australian Bar Association
 The Tasmanian Bar
 Victorian Bar Association
 Western Australian Bar Association

Presidents
The previous six Presidents of the ABA are:

A number of previous Presidents of the ABA have subsequently been appointed to Federal and State Courts and Tribunals.

References

1963 establishments in Australia
Bar associations
Legal organisations based in Australia